TWN may refer to
 Tarifverbund Nordwestschweiz, the twn (fare network) in north-western Switzerland

 ISO 3166-1 alpha-3 country code assigned to Taiwan, under the designated title of "Taiwan, Province of China" 

 The Weather Network, a Canadian specialty channel
 The name used in certain export markets by Triumph, a German former motorcycle manufacturer.
 translatewiki.net, a wiki used to translate software
 The White Noise, an American rock band from Los Angeles, California
 Town Green railway station, Lancashire, England (National Rail station code TWN)
 Tsing Wun stop, a Light Rail stop in Hong Kong (MTR station code TWN)